The Brinkmeyer House, at 605 W. Gurley in Prescott, Arizona, was built in 1899. It was listed on the National Register of Historic Places in 1978.

It was built from available house plans in a simplified shingle style.

Its first owner was Henry Brinkmeyer, an immigrant from Germany.

It was open to the public for a "boutique"/bazaar event that was a fundraiser for the Citizens Cemetery (which is another National Register-listed historic site within the Prescott Armory Historic District) in 2007.

References

External links
Brinkmeyer Robie House, at AirBnb

Shingle Style architecture in Arizona
National Register of Historic Places in Yavapai County, Arizona
Houses completed in 1899